This is a list of ship designs by the Emergency Fleet Corporation, since the corporation's inception in 1917.

Steel ships

Note: Some ships had turbines, other ships had triple expansion engines, not both. Some cargo ships were converted to reefers, not all ships of a cargo type design. Some ships burned coal, others oil, not both. Unless otherwise noted.

Design 1042

Design 1045

Design 1046

Design 1047

Design 1049

References

World War I merchant ships of the United States
Lists of ships of the United States